In mathematics and multivariate statistics, the centering matrix is a symmetric and idempotent matrix, which when multiplied with a vector has the same effect as subtracting the mean of the components of the vector from every component of that vector.

Definition 
The centering matrix of size n is defined as the n-by-n matrix

For example

,

 ,

Properties 
Given a column-vector,  of size n, the centering property of  can be expressed as

 is symmetric positive semi-definite.

Once the mean has been removed, it is zero and removing it again has no effect.

 is  singular. The effects of applying the transformation  cannot be reversed.

 has the eigenvalue 1 of multiplicity n − 1 and eigenvalue 0 of multiplicity 1.

 has a nullspace of dimension 1, along the vector .

 is an orthogonal projection matrix. That is,  is a projection of  onto the (n − 1)-dimensional subspace that is orthogonal to the nullspace . (This is the subspace of all n-vectors whose components sum to zero.)

Application 
Although multiplication by the centering matrix is not a computationally efficient way of removing the mean from a vector, it is a convenient analytical tool. It can be used not only to remove the mean of a single vector, but also of multiple vectors stored in the rows or columns of an m-by-n matrix .

The left multiplication by  subtracts a corresponding mean value from each of the n columns, so that each column of the product  has a zero mean.
The multiplication on both sides creates a doubly centred matrix , whose row and column means are equal to zero.

The centering matrix provides in particular a succinct way to express the scatter matrix,  of a data sample , where  is the sample mean. The centering matrix allows us to express the scatter matrix more compactly as

References 

Data processing
Matrices